Filippo Guccione (born 8 November 1992) is an Italian professional footballer who plays as a winger for  club Mantova.

Club career
Guccione started his career in Cerea. He played two Serie C season, for Casale and Bassano. Between 2014 and 2020 he played on Serie D, winning the promotion with Delta Porto Tolle on 2014–15 season.

On 12 July 2019, he joined to Mantova. He was named captain of the team.

References

External links
 
 

1992 births
Living people
Sportspeople from the Province of Mantua
Footballers from Lombardy
Italian footballers
Association football midfielders
Serie C players
Serie D players
Casale F.B.C. players
Pro Sesto 2013 players
Mantova 1911 players